Brekka is a village in Arendal municipality in Agder county, Norway. The village is located along the European route E18 highway on the western shore of the lake Molandsvann. Historically, Brekka was the seat of the old municipality of Østre Moland (from 1838 until 1962). Austre Moland Church is located in this village.

References

Villages in Agder
Arendal